Lipocarpha micrantha, known as dwarf bulrush, small-flowered hemicarpha, small-flower halfchaff sedge, common hemicarpa and tiny-flowered sedge, is a species of flowering plant in the sedge family (Cyperaceae) native to North America.

Conservation status
It is listed as endangered in Maryland, New Jersey, New York (state) and Pennsylvania. It is listed as threatened in Connecticut, Maine, Massachusetts, Ohio, and Rhode Island.

References

Cyperaceae
Flora of North America